is a former Japanese football player.

Club statistics

References

External links

1981 births
Living people
Hannan University alumni
Association football people from Aichi Prefecture
Japanese footballers
J2 League players
Tokushima Vortis players
Association football midfielders